This is a record of Peru's results at the Copa América. Ever since their first Copa América, Peru has had good showings. It is often remembered by fans that Peru was the fourth team (after Uruguay, Argentina, and Brazil) to win the South American cup. Even though in 1939 Peru played against only 5 of the South American nations (with no participation from Argentina or Brazil), in 1975 Peru won the cup once more (this time with all the CONMEBOL teams participating).

Recently, Peru has only been able to get only as far as the runners-up of the tournament which holds its own prestige as being the oldest tournament of international football; along with having Argentina and Brazil (the 2 teams usually considered among the top 5 in the football world), which have also recently been dominating the tournament.

Overall record

Record by opponent

Peru's highest margin of victory at a Copa América is four goals, which they have managed a number of times: They won 4–0 against Ecuador in 1941 and 1949 and Colombia in 1949, and 5–1 against Colombia in 1947 and Venezuela in 1991. Peru's biggest defeat was a 0–7 loss against Brazil in the 1997 semi-final.

Peru 1927

At this point Peru is the 7th nation to join the competition, and in 1927 the games are decided to be played there. Although only 3 teams came to the tournament, Argentina, Uruguay, and Bolivia; the participating federations decided that the 1st and 2nd places of the competition would represent South America for the Olympic Games to be played at Amsterdam in 1928. The other federations (Brazil, Chile, and Paraguay) did not participate because of economic and sport problems. Peru gained third place after only beating Bolivia.

Single phase

Goalscorers

Peru 1935

This tournament is characterized by the Argentine and Uruguayan conflict that rooted from the 1930 World Cup. The winners here were going to once more represent South America for the Olympic Games, this time to be played at Berlin. Brazil, Bolivia, and Paraguay had withdrawn from the tournament. Peru's first game resulted at a 1–0 loss, with a goal scored by a Uruguayan player at the 80th minute. The second one was not much better, and Peru lost 4–1 against Argentina. The last game was won by Peru 1–0 against Chile. The tournament gave Peru the third spot, and helped it train and improve for the 1936 Summer Olympics.

Single phase

Goalscorers

Peru 1939

This was the first international title the team won. During this time, the team had greatly improved since the World Cup and was re-assuring that dominance they had shown over Austria in the 1936 Berlin Olympics. Peru won all 4 games which were against Ecuador (5–2), Chile (3–1), Paraguay (3–0), and Uruguay (2–1) in the final. It's worth the mention that in this tournament Argentina and Brazil did not participate, but that does not take down the merit of Peru's notable act. Peruvian Teodoro Fernández also was the top goal-scorer of the tournament. As an anecdote, Peru was the fourth South American team that raised the trophy (The first three being Argentina, Uruguay, and Brazil).

Single phase

Goalscorers

Brazil 1949

By this time, Peruvian football was recognized by good game and playful management of the ball. Several interesting players came to the national team, but the team faced several problems with the directors and the players themselves. Peru won all but two games. As such, the national team got third place. Paraguay and Brazil, the only ones who beat Peru, had to later play a last tie-breaker match.

Single phase

Peru 1953

As much as Peru did, the team was not capable to achieve another Copa América title until later years. Yet, the games played in 1953 are memorable to Peruvian football history because it was the first time Peru was able to beat Brazil (A certain something not many have been able to achieve). The goal was scored by Navarrete.

1975 Copa América

This tournament had no fixed venue. For the first phase, Peru was grouped with Chile and Bolivia. After winning both games, which were played both at home and away, Peru qualified for the semifinals along with Colombia, Brazil, and Uruguay (Which were the defending champions). Perhaps unlucky for Peru, they had to face Brazil for their semifinal. At the city of Belo Horizonte in Brazil, Peru beat the Verdeamarela by a margin of 3 to 1 with two goals from Enrique Cassareto and one by Teófilo Cubillas. The game played back home at Lima was won by Brazil 2–0. Due to the goal difference, the winner (Which turned out being Peru) was chosen by sorting.

The final match was played against Colombia, who had beaten Uruguay. The game played at Bogotá was won by the Colombians 1 to 0. The game played at Lima was won by the Peruvians 2 to 0. Even though this meant Peru should win by the goal difference, a last game was played at the city of Caracas. With a goal at the 25th minute of the game by Hugo Sotil, Peru obtained its second international title.

Finals

First leg

Second leg

Play-off

Ecuador 1993

Peru had an acceptable participacion in this Copa América when they passed as the leaders of their group with 4 points, 1 more point than Brazil. Paraguay and Chile also were part of this group. Peru tied with Brazil 0–0, tied with Paraguay 1–1 and beat Chile 1–0. The lead scorer for Peru in this competition was José del Solar with three goals. In quarterfinals Peru was eliminated by Mexico 4–2.

Group stage

Group B

Bolivia 1997

The team was able to reach the quarterfinals of this cup and eliminated Argentina (2:1) to advanced into the semifinals. In the semifinals, Peru faced Brazil, and lost by a margin of 7 to 0 (Peru's worst result to date). For the third place spot, Peru faced Mexico. The game was won by Mexico by a goal scored at the 82nd minute of the game.

Group stage

Group B

Peru vs Uruguay

Bolivia vs Peru

Peru vs Venezuela

Quarter-finals

Semi-finals

Third-place match

Peru 2004

The 2004 Copa América, which they hosted, saw the team lose in the quarter-finals against Argentina. This began a wave of criticism against Peru's then coach Paulo Autuori, who boycotted the media, and his squad.

Group stage

Group A

Peru vs Bolivia

Peru vs Venezuela

Peru vs Colombia

Quarter-finals

Venezuela 2007

Peru's campaign in the 2007 Copa América saw another futile attempt of the Peruvian squad, eliminated again in the quarter-finals by Argentina; the blame for this was mainly given to the tactics and formations of the coach Julio César Uribe, who did not call the appropriate players to the national team. After this situation, Peru replaced Uribe for José del Solar.

Group stage

Group A

Uruguay vs Peru

Venezuela vs Peru

Peru vs Bolivia

Quarter-finals

Argentina 2011

Peru made its debut against Uruguay, with a 1–1 draw, with Paolo Guerrero scoring for Peru. A 1–0 win over Mexico came next and finally a 1–0 loss against Chile, which it suffered due to a 90th minute own goal of a corner kick, would qualify Peru to the next round. At the quarter-finals match, Peru faced Colombia. All analysts placed Colombia as the big favorites. Peru, however, managed to win 2–0 after extra time with goals from Carlos Lobatón and Juan Manuel Vargas. At the semi-finals, Peru lost against the eventual champion Uruguay. Peru moved on to the third place match against the other surprise of the tournament, Venezuela. Peru beat Venezuela thoroughly with a 4–1 victory. A hat-trick by Paolo Guerrero, the Peruvian star of the tournament, fueled Peru and allowed them to claim the third-place bronze medal at the Copa América. Paolo Guerrero was crowned as the top goal scorer of the tournament.

Group stage

Group C

Uruguay vs Peru

Peru vs Mexico

Chile vs Peru

Quarter-finals

Semi-finals

Third-place play-off

Chile 2015 
The Peruvian team was one of the 12 participating teams in the 2015 Copa América, a tournament that took place between June 11 and July 4, 2015, in Chile. The Peruvian team played his thirtieth Copa América and the fifteenth consecutive. In the draw held on November 24, 2014, in Viña del Mar, Peru was paired in Group C along with Brazil, Colombia and Venezuela. Peru's debut in the competition occurred on June 14, 2015, losing 2:1 to Brazil. Four days later he got his first victory by defeating Venezuela by a score of 1:0. Peru closed its participation in the first phase with a goalless draw against Colombia. Peru added four points which allowed them to occupy second place in their group and advance to the next phase. In the quarterfinals, they faced the Bolivian team, which they won 3:1 with 3 goals from Paolo Guerrero. In the next round they faced the Chilean team, where the locals were victorious 2:1 with two goals from Eduardo Vargas. In the match for third place, the Peruvian team faced Paraguay, the match ended with a 2:0 victory, with goals from André Carrillo and Paolo Guerrero.

Group stage

Group C

Brazil vs Peru

Peru vs Venezuela

Colombia vs Peru

Quarter-finals

Semi-finals

Third-place play-off

USA 2016 
In the draw held on February 21, 2016, in New York, the Peruvian team was in Group B along with Haiti, Brazil and Ecuador. The team's debut in the competition took place on June 4, 2016, defeating Haiti 1:0. Four days later they drew 2:2 against Ecuador. Peru closed its participation in the first phase with a 1:0 victory against Brazil. The Peruvian team added seven points which allowed him to occupy the first place in his group and advance to the next phase.

In the quarterfinals, they faced the Colombian team with which they tied 0:0 in regulation time, they were finally defeated 4:2 in the penalty shootout. With this result, Peru ranked fifth. The team's top scorers were Raúl Ruidíaz, Edison Flores, Christian Cueva and Paolo Guerrero with one goal each.

Group stage

Group B

Haiti vs Peru

Ecuador vs Peru

Brazil vs Peru

Quarter-finals

Squads

See also 
 Football in Peru
 History of the Peru national football team
 Peruvian Football Federation
 Peru national football team results (2000–2019)
 Peru national football team results (2020–present)

Footnotes

Peru national football team
Countries at the Copa América